Lalakai Foketi (born 22 December 1994) is an Australian rugby union player who currently plays as a centre for the  in Super Rugby.

Career
Foketi first came to prominence in 2013 with some impressive displays while playing for the Manly Marlins colts side. As a result, he was named in the Melbourne Rebels extended playing squad for the 2014 Super Rugby season.

International
Foketi was an Australia Schoolboys representative in 2012, and played four matches for the Australia Under 20 side at the 2013 IRB Junior World Championship in France. He also played four matches in the 2014 tournament in New Zealand.

References

1994 births
Living people
Australian rugby union players
Rugby union centres
Melbourne Rebels players
Greater Sydney Rams players
Rugby union players from Hamilton, New Zealand
Rugby union players from Sydney
New Zealand emigrants to Australia
Aviron Bayonnais players
Expatriate rugby union players in France
Bay of Plenty rugby union players
New South Wales Waratahs players
Sydney (NRC team) players
Australia international rugby union players